Kolbe Catholic College is an independent Roman Catholic co-educational secondary day school, located in the  suburb of Rockingham, Western Australia within the Archdiocese of Perth.

Overview 
The college was founded in 1989 by Brother Pat Carey, of the Order of the Christian Brothers, in Rockingham. The school has a current enrolment of more than 1200 students from Years 7 to 12. The college's motto, "Courage, Faith, Excellence", is inspired by their patron, Saint Maximilian Kolbe. The college is recognised as an Apple Distinguished School and operates a 1:1 iPad Program for middle school students

The college is in close vicinity to the Mike Barnett Sports Complex, Rockingham Aquatic Centre and Transperth Bus Station. Murdoch University's campus and Murdoch Community Library are located immediately behind the college.

Houses

Chisholm 
Named after Caroline Chisholm, the house is represented by the colour red.

Loyola 
Named after Saint Ignatius of Loyola, the house is represented by the colour purple.

MacKillop 
Named after Saint Mary MacKillop, the house is represented by the colour yellow.

Rice 
Named after Edmund Ignatius Rice, the house is represented by the colour green.

Teresa 
Named after Saint Teresa of Calcutta, otherwise known as, Mother Teresa, the house is represented by the colour blue.

Xavier 
Named after Saint Francis Xavier, the house is represented by the colour teal.

See also

 Kolbe Catholic College, Greenvale
 List of schools in the Perth metropolitan area
 Catholic education in Australia

References

Rockingham, Western Australia
Catholic secondary schools in Perth, Western Australia
1989 establishments in Australia
Educational institutions established in 1989